Yevseichev (masculine) or Yevseicheva (feminine) is a Russian last name, a variant of Yevseyev. It derives from a patronymic which itself was derived from a patronymic ("Yevseichev" literally means a son of Yevseich, with "Yevseich" also being a patronymic), meaning that the first bearer of this last name was a grandson of someone named Yevsey.

References

Notes

Sources
И. М. Ганжина (I. M. Ganzhina). "Словарь современных русских фамилий" (Dictionary of Modern Russian Last Names). Москва, 2001. 

Russian-language surnames
